The Alliance for the Progress of Peru was an electoral alliance in Peru formed for the 2016 general election, dominated by the eponymous party Alliance for Progress and led by former Governor of La Libertad César Acuña Peralta.

Constituent parties 

Alliance for Progress (Alianza para el Progreso, APP), conservative, led by César Acuña 
National Restoration (Restauración Nacional, RN), evangelist, led by Humberto Lay
We Are Peru (Somos Perú, SP), Christian democratic, led by Fernando Andrade

In the 2011 general election, the Alliance for Progress and National Restoration was part of the Alliance for the Great Change (Alianza por el Gran Cambio) while We Are Peru was part of the Possible Peru Alliance (Alianza Perú Posible).

In the congressional election on April 10, the alliance won 9.2% of the popular vote and 9 out of 130 seats, all going to the Alliance for Progress.

Presidential candidate César Acuña was barred from the election on 9 March 2016, by a decision of the Electoral Jury for allegedly vote buying in a campaign trail.

Electoral history

Presidential election

Elections to the Congress of the Republic

References 

Defunct political party alliances in Peru